The 1932 Mercer Bears football team was an American football team that represented Mercer University as a member of both the Dixie Conference and the Southern Intercollegiate Athletic Association (SIAA) during the 1932 college football season. In their fourth year under head coach Lake Russell, the team compiled a 6–2 record.

Schedule

References

Mercer
Mercer
Mercer Bears football seasons
Mercer Bears football